Panduwasnuwara Raja Maha Vihara (Sinhalaː පඬුවස්නුවර රජ මහා විහාරය) is an ancient Buddhist temple situated in Panduwasnuwara, Kurunegala District, Sri Lanka. The temple has been formally recognised by the Government as an archaeological site in Sri Lanka. The designation was declared on 13 March 1970 under the government Gazette number 14897.

Vihara inscriptions
The history of Panduwasnuwara Vihara is believed to be dated back to the period of Anuradhapura Kingdom. Inscriptions belong to the eras of King Sena II, King Kashyapa IV and King Udaya II have been found from the land of Panduwasnuwara Vihara.

The pillar inscription near the Bodhi tree

Gallery

References

External links
Panduwasnuwara and the untold tales

Buddhist temples in Kurunegala District
Archaeological protected monuments in Kurunegala District
Sri Lanka inscriptions